The 1977 Special Honours in New Zealand was a Special Honours List, published on 1 November 1977, that recognised the service of the outgoing vice-regal couple, Sir Denis and Lady Blundell.

Companion of the Queen's Service Order (QSO)
For community service
 June Daphne, Her Excellency Lady Blundell

For public services
 His Excellency Sir Edward Denis Blundell  – principal companion of the Queen's Service Order since 1975, and governor-general and commander-in-chief in and over New Zealand since 1972

References

1977 in New Zealand
1977 awards